Elsie Singmaster Lewars (August 29, 1879 – September 30, 1958) was an American author from Macungie, Pennsylvania who has been described as "perhaps Macungie's most famous citizen". She received a Newbery Honor.

Early and personal life

Singmaster was born on August 29, 1879, in Schuylkill Haven, Pennsylvania to parents of German ancestry. She was educated at Allentown High School and West Chester Normal School, before studying at Cornell University from 1898 to 1900. She then attended Radcliffe College, from which she graduated in 1907. 

In 1912, she married musician and English professor Harold Steck Lewars. She added his surname to hers but continued to publish as Elsie Singmaster. She was pregnant with Lewars' child when he died at the age of 33 in March 1915. Their baby, Singmaster's only child, died two months later in May.

Writing career

Singmaster wrote many short stories and books between 1905 and 1950. Her first published short story was The Lèse-Majesté of Hans Heckendorn, in the November 1905 issue of Scribner's Magazine. Her first published book was When Sarah Saved the Day, in 1909. Her 1924 short story The Courier of the Czar earned a position of merit in the 1924 O. Henry Award and, perhaps her most famous title, Swords of Steel, received a Newbery Honor in 1934. Her final work was It Was Once a Jail, published in The Philadelphia Inquirer in January 1950. 

An annotated bibliography of Singmaster's Gettysburg writings was published in 2015. Gettysburg College's Musselman Library digitized The Hidden Road in 2019 when the 1923 text entered the public domain.

Death
Singmaster died September 30, 1958 and was buried in Fairview Cemetery in Macungie, Pennsylvania.

Bibliography

 When Sarah Saved the Day: 1909
 Gettysburg:  Stories of the Red Harvest and the Aftermath: 1913
 Katy Gaumer: 1915
 Emmeline: 1915
 The Story of Lutheran Missions: 1917
 The Long Journey: 1917
 Martin Luther: 1917
 Basil Everman: 1920
 Ellen Levis: 1921
 Bennett Malin: 1922
 The Hidden Road: 1923
 A Boy at Gettysburg: 1924
 Bred in the Bone, and other Stories: 1925
 The Book of the Constitution: 1926
 The Book of the United States: 1926
 Keller's Anna Ruth: 1926
 Sewing Susie: 1927
 What Everybody Wanted: 1928
 Virginia's Bandit: 1929
 You Make Your Own Luck: 1929
 A Little Money Ahead: 1930
 Swords of Steel: 1933
 The Magic Mirror: 1934
 The Loving Heart: 1937
 Stories of Pennsylvania: 1937
 Rifles for Washington: 1938
 A Cloud of Witnesses: 1939
 Stories to Read at Christmas: 1940
 A High Wind Rising: 1943
 I Speak for Thaddeus Stevens: 1947
 I Heard of a River: 1948

References

External links

 Elsie Singmaster Society of Gettysburg

1879 births
1958 deaths
20th-century American novelists
American children's writers
American women novelists
Newbery Honor winners
20th-century American women writers
Radcliffe College alumni
Cornell University alumni
People from Schuylkill Haven, Pennsylvania
American Lutherans
William Allen High School alumni